Peary Charan Sircar (also spelled Pyari Churn Sircar or Pyari Charan Sircar in contemporary documents; 1823–1875), was an educationist and textbook writer in nineteenth century Bengal. His series of Reading Books introduced a whole generation of Bengalis to the English language, sold in the millions and were translated into every major Indian language. He was also a pioneer of women's education in Bengal and was called 'Arnold of the East'.

Early life and family
Sircar was born at Chorbagan in North Calcutta. His family hailed from Taragram in Hooghly district of West Bengal, and the family name was originally Das. For services rendered, the Nawab of Bengal had awarded the title 'Sarkar' to Bireshwar Das, an ancestor. Bhairav Chandra Sarkar, Pyari Charan's father, had become quite wealthy as a ship chandler serving the East India Company, and the family was a fairly good example of the new bhadralok class. Sarkar was and educated at David Hare's Pataldanga School, and admitted to Hindu College, but shortly afterwards his father and then one of his brothers died. His eldest brother was working in Hooghly and could only send money to their mother; as a Hindu widow she had little standing in the family and was ejected from the family home, along with Sircar and his younger brothers and sisters.

Sircar was forced to leave college and take up a job in 1843 as a teacher at the Hooghly School; his teachers gave him glowing certificates and praised his acumen in mathematics and English. In the same year (1843) his essay 'On the Effect upon India of the New Communication with Europe by Means of Steam' appeared in the Department of Public Instruction's Report on Education. Sarkar became headmaster of Barasat School (later named Barasat Peary Charan Sarkar Government High School in his honour), in 1846, and occupied the post till 1854.

His son, J.N. Sircar, Esq., Barrister-at-Law, was a lawyer who practised in the Central Provinces and Berar. He was one of the earliest Indian students of Balliol College, Oxford. A great-nephew of his was Brajendranath De, Esq., ICS, who was the District Magistrate and Collector of Hooghly, and Commissioner (Offgt.) of Burdwan.

The Barasat Girls' School

At Barasat, two brothers, Nabin Krishna Mitra and Kalikrishna Mitra, offered in 1847 to fund Bengal's first private school for girls if Sarkar would agree to help set it up. The school (later renamed Kalikrishna Girls' High School) began operations, but Barasat was an extremely conservative Brahmin-majority area and the residents were outraged. Swapan Basu, in his biography of Sircar, alleges that rumours circulated that several landlords were offering money to have Sircar assassinated (p. 24). At this juncture John Elliot Drinkwater Bethune stepped in to help. He exhorted the financiers not to give up, and with time the opposition weakened. Bethune visited the Barasat school in 1848, and was so impressed that in 1849 he set up the Bethune School for Girls in Calcutta. Sircar continued to be active in campaigning for women's education, helping to set up several more such schools, including a technical and an agricultural school. In 1854, with a stipend of two hundred rupees, he was appointed headmaster of the Colootollah School and was responsible for changing its name to Hare School.

Presidency College
In 1863 he was appointed as a temporary lecturer at Presidency College, Kolkata, and in 1867 he was made permanent. There was some opposition to this as he had never completed his education, but in those days this was not so unusual as it later was to become, and Sircar's abilities were plainly evident to the authorities.

Sircar continued his campaigning for women's rights, donating two and a half thousand rupees (then a huge sum of money) to the Widow remarriage Fund in 1869. In 1873, he became a member of the working committee of Keshub Chunder Sen's Society for the Suppression of Vice in Indian Society. He was also associated with the Bengal Temperance Society. Keshab Chandra Sen later took up his work on temperance in Indian Reform Association.

Even after he was appointed as Assistant Professor at Presidency College, he used to visit Colootollah school and take a few classes whenever he could. He was a very meticulous teacher and always corrected his students' work minutely. He also insisted that they learn practical skills as well, and used to teach them gardening. In 1875, while working in his garden, he cut his finger. The wound turned gangrenous and an operation failed to save his life. He died on 1 October.

The Reading Books
The First Book of Reading for Native Children was published in 1850, probably by the School Book Press, and the rest of the Reading Books (numbers two to six) came out between 1851 and 1870, not necessarily in sequence. In 1875 Sarkar's friend and colleague at Presidency College, E. R. Lethbridge, proposed a revision of the books and began negotiations with Thacker and Spink of Calcutta to republish them. However, at around this time Lethbridge was contacted by Macmillan and Company and (rather unethically) he gave the books to them. Thacker had already printed a few copies and when this was discovered Macmillan had to buy them up and soothe Thacker's ruffled feelings.
Macmillan were looking for a ready made series with which to launch their Indian publishing business.

Other achievements

He played a significant role in the Bengal Renaissance. Apart from his role in initiating women's education and impressing upon people to send their daughters to school when Bethune school was opened, he played a pioneering role in the teaching of agriculture in a scientific manner. He set up a vocational training centre for the children of women workers and was instrumental in opening many new schools. He was one of the patrons of Hindu Mela.

He took charge of editing the government newspaper Education Gazette in 1866, but resigned from that position when he was not allowed to publish certain news. He took a leading part to promote prohibition and was one of the founders of Eden Hindu Hostel.
 
He published two newspapers named Well Wisher and Hitasadhak.

Sources
Sangsad Bangla Charitrabhidhan (The Sangsad Dictionary of Biography) (Calcutta: Sahitya Sangsad, 1998) (Bengali language source).
Swapan Basu, Pyari Charan Sarkar, (Calcutta: Bangla Sahitya Akademi, 2001) (Bengali language source).

References

1823 births
1875 deaths
Bengali Hindus
Bengali educators
19th-century Bengalis
Hare School alumni
Academic staff of Presidency University, Kolkata
Academic staff of the University of Calcutta
Bengali writers
19th-century Indian educational theorists
Writers from Kolkata
People from Hooghly district
Founders of Indian schools and colleges
19th-century Indian non-fiction writers
19th-century Indian writers
19th-century Indian educators
19th-century Indian male writers
Educators from West Bengal
Indian writers
Indian male writers
Indian educators
Indian non-fiction writers
Indian male non-fiction writers
Indian educational theorists
Educationists from India
Indian editors
Indian newspaper editors